Becky Thompson is a US-based scholar, human rights activist, cross-cultural trainer, poet and yoga teacher. She is a professor of sociology in the College of Social Sciences, Policy and Practice at Simmons University. She also teaches yoga at the Dorchester YMCA in Boston. Since 2015 she has worked in Greece as a human rights advocate with people from Syria, Afghanistan, Palestine, Somalia.

Thompson has contributed thought-leadership and scholarship to groups interested in organizational transformation, contemplative practices, trauma, healing and social justice globally. She is the author/editor of twelve books including Teaching with Tenderness, Survivors on the Yoga Mat: Stories for those Healing from Trauma”, A Promise and a Way of Life, and Zero is the Whole I Fall into at Night and has received the Ex Ophidia Poetry Prize, the Creative Justice Chapbook Poetry Prize and the Gustavus Myers Outstanding Book Award on Human Rights.

Thompson has been affiliated with several professional organizations, including the Association for the Study of the Worldwide African Diaspora and the National Women's Studies Association and is a representative of Cetlalic, Tlahuica Center for the Study of Language and Cultural Exchange in Cuernavaca, Mexico. She has taught seminars on social justice, yoga and creative writing in Guangzhou, Dali, and Beijing China and for the International Women's Partnership for Peace and Justice in Chiang Mai, Thailand.

Education
After obtaining her bachelor's degree in sociology from the University of California, Santa Cruz in 1982, Thompson enrolled at Brandeis University and received her master's and doctoral degree in sociology in 1986 and 1991, respectively. From 1992 till 1993, she served as a Rockefeller Foundation postdoctoral fellow in African American studies at Princeton University. She earned her MFA in creative writing at Stonecoast at the University of Southern Maine in 2021.

Career
Thompson started her academic career with the University of Massachusetts as a lecturer in the department of sociology and department of women's studies from 1987 to 1989. She then held an appointment at the University of Memphis as assistant professor of sociology before joining the Wesleyan University faculty in African American Studies from 1994 to 1996. In 1996 she joined the Simmons College faculty, where she became full professor in 2007. From 1996 to 2005 she also served as adjunct faculty at the Union Institute of Graduate Studies. From 2008 to 2010, she served as a professor of Women's and Ethnic Studies Program at the University of Colorado. In her career, Thompson also held visiting appointments at several institutes, including scholar-in-residence at China Women's University in 2018 and Duke University in African American studies in 2002–2003.

Thompson also held several administrative appointments. She served as the coordinator of the Teaching Race, Teaching Gender Speakers Series at Duke University from 2002 till 2003, was the program director for the Women's and Ethnic Studies Program at University of Colorado from 2008 till 2009, and chair of the department of sociology in the College of Arts & Sciences at Simmons College from 2012 till 2014. Between 2020 and 2021, she served as an antiracism consultant at Northeastern University and for Partners for Perinatal Health.

 Work 
Thompson's scholarly activities emphasize poetry as well as research on educational transformation, social justice and healing. She has authored her books on a variety of topics; with a feminist social justice focus at the nexus of race, gender, religion, nationality, sexuality, and the body. Thompson's first book on poetry was entitled Zero is the Whole I Fall into at Night.

Thompson has also authored many scholarly books, including A Hunger So Wide and So Deep, and Survivors on the Yoga Mat, which focus on trauma's impact on embodiment. Her book Teaching with Tenderness: Toward an Embodied Practice follows in the tradition of bell hooks’ Teaching to Transgress and Paulo Freire's Pedagogy of the Oppressed. Naomi Simmons-Thorne reviewed that Thompson's pedagogy of tenderness recognizes "the embodied needs, traumas and inequalities that can mitigate and overwhelm learning" and the book delivers "instruction in such a way as to convey compassion for the lived experiences of students". Thompson has also co-edited anthologies on multiple subjects: poetry by and for refugees, multiracial education, HIV/AIDS from the Black Diaspora, and racial identity.

Thompson's works have been recognized by the Rockefeller Foundation, the National Endowment for the Humanities, the American Association for University Women, the Ford Foundation, and Political Research Associates. She has also been invited for interviews on radio and other media platforms to present her views regarding her recent publications and her other activities in the field.

Awards and honors
1992 –1993 – Rockefeller Foundation Post-Doctoral Fellowship in Afro-American Studies, Princeton University 
1994 – Gustavus Myers Award for Outstanding Book on Human Rights in North America presented to “Beyond a Dream Deferred: Multicultural Education and the Politics of Excellence” (co-editor, Sangeeta Tyagi)
2000 – Mothering Without a Compass: White Mother’s Love, Black Son’s Courage, Chosen by Insight Out's Book of the Month Club for Gay and Lesbian Series
2009 – The Mosaic Outstanding Teaching Award, University of Colorado
2021 – Winner, Ex Ophidia Press Poetry Book Prize for “To Speak in Salt”

Bibliography
BooksBeyond A Dream Deferred: Multicultural Education and the Politics of Excellence (1993) ISBN 9780816622696A Hunger So Wide and So Deep: American Women Speak Out on Eating Problems (1994) ISBN 9781452902777Names We Call Home: Autobiography on Racial Identity (1996) ISBN 9780415911627Mothering Without A Compass: White Mother's Love, Black Son's Courage (2000) ISBN 9780816636358A Promise and a Way of Life: White Antiracist Activism (2001) ISBN 9780816636334Fingernails Across the Chalkboard: Poetry and Prose on HIV/AIDS from the Black Diaspora (2007) ISBN 9780883782743When the Center Is on Fire: Passionate Social Theory for Our Times (2008) ISBN 9780292717763Zero is the Whole I Fall Into at Night (2011) ISBN 9781599483344Survivors on the Yoga Mat: Stories for Those Healing from Trauma (2014) ISBN 9781583948262Teaching with Tenderness: Toward an Embodied Practice (2017) ISBN 9780252041167Making Mirrors: Righting/Writing by and for Refugees'' (2019) ISBN 9781623719784

Selected poetry and poetry reviews
Thompson, B. (2017). Teaching poetry in Khora. Anchor Magazine: Where Spirituality and Social Justice Meet, 8, 80
Thompson, B. (2018). The lotus grows out of the mud. Nonviolence Magazine, Spring/Winter, 29–30.
Thompson, B. (2019) “Ahmed Talks to his 13-year-old Brother;” “Found Conversation;” and “Praise Poem for Political Poets.” CURA: Magazine.
Thompson, B. (2020). “Cartography in Lesvos” and “In The Slip Between Coasts.” Feminist Studies, Alexis Pauline Gumbs, poetry editor. Vol. 46 (2).
Thompson, B. (2021) “Hold onto Time,” “If We Were Boys,” and “Instructions to a Young Mother,” Sonora Review, special issue on gender-based violence.
Thompson, B. (2021). “Haiku Questions,” Pensive: A Global Journal of Spirituality and the Arts.

References 

Living people
University of California, Santa Cruz alumni
Brandeis University alumni
University of Southern Maine alumni
American poets
Year of birth missing (living people)